1971 Dhaka University massacre refers to the massacre of students and staff at the University of Dhaka. In March 1971, the Pakistan Army Eastern Wing Commander Tikka Khan launched Operation Searchlight on the orders of dictator Yahya Khan to crush the Bengali nationalist movement. As part of the operation, the Pakistani forces performed the 1971 Dhaka University massacre.

Background 
After the Bengali Awami League had won a decisive majority (capturing 167 out of 313 seats) in the 1970 Pakistan parliamentary elections, the Bengali population expected a swift transfer of power to the Awami League based on the Six Point Programme. On 28 February 1971, Yahya Khan, then President of Pakistan, under the pressure of Zulfikar Ali Bhutto's Pakistan Peoples Party (PPP), postponed the national assembly meeting scheduled for March. The PPP had already started lobbying to weaken the stand of Sheikh Mujibur Rahman, and Bhutto was heard saying that he wanted the Bengalis to stay away. The Awami League, in response to the postponement, launched a program of non-cooperation (largely outlined in the 7 March Awami League rally) which was so successful that the authority of the Pakistani government became limited to military cantonments and official government institutions in East Pakistan.

Clashes between Bengalis and the Pakistan Army, and between the Bengalis and Biharis erupted and had now become commonplace. President Yahya Khan flew to Dacca to hold talks with Mujibur Rahman, then leader of the Awami League, in March and was later joined by Bhutto, whose party had secured the second-largest share of seats (81 out of 300) in the general elections. Unwilling to transfer federal power from West Pakistan to East Pakistan as demanded by the Awami League (fearing a transfer of power would weaken or destroy the multiethnic Pakistani federation), or to lose face by backing down in face of the non-cooperation movement, the West Pakistani generals, most of which (including Commander-in-Chief Gul Hassan Khan) supported the PPP, finally decided on a military crackdown against the rebelling Bengalis in East Pakistan.

After the convening of the Pakistan National Assembly was postponed by Yahya Khan on 1 March, ethnic Biharis in East Pakistan, who supported West Pakistan, were targeted by the Bengali majority. In early March 1971, over 300 Biharis were killed in rioting by Bengali mobs in Chittagong. Following these series of incidents, the Government of Pakistan used the "Bihari massacre" to justify its military intervention in East Pakistan on 25 March, when it initiated Operation Searchlight.

History 
The Pakistan Army convoy that attacked Dhaka University on 25 March 1971 included the 18th Punjab Regiment, 22nd Frontier Force, and 32nd Panjab regiments along with several battalions. Armed with heavy weapons such as tanks, automatic rifles, rocket launchers, heavy mortars, and light machine guns, they encircled Dhaka University from the east (unit 41), from the south (unit 88) and from the north (unit 26).
At the beginning of Operation Searchlight 10 teachers of Dhaka University were killed.

Professor Fajllur Rahman and his two relatives were killed at building 23 situated at Nilkhet. Professor Rahman's wife escaped because she was not in the country. The Pakistan Army also attacked the house of Professor Anwar Pasha and Professor Rashidul Hassan (English Department). Both of them survived by hiding under beds, but were killed later in the war by the Al-Badr militia. Professor Rafiqul Islam (Bangla Literature Department) was in building 24. Two wounded women with their children stayed in the entrance of the building for some time. When the Army came they found blood on the stairs and, surmising that other groups had done the massacre, left. This way Professor Rafiqul escaped. Later he stated that there had been one East Pakistani professor at that building, who left home before 25 March. All other non-Bengali families did the same without informing others.

At Number 12 Fuller Road, the Army called on Sayed Ali Noki (Professor Social Science). They allowed him to go but killed Professor Abdul Muktadir (Geology) who was a resident of the same building. His body was found at Jahurul Huq Hall (then Iqbal Hall). He was buried at Paltan by his relatives. Professor K. M. Munim (English Literature), the house tutor of Salimullah Student Hall, was injured at Salimullah Hall. Professors A R Khan Khadim and Sharafat Ali of the Mathematics department were killed in Dhaka Hall. At Jagannath Hall they attacked teachers' residence and harassed Professor Mirja Huda (Economics) and Professor Mofijullah Kabir (History).

When Jagannath Hall, a student dormitory for minority Hindu students, was attacked, university staff quarters were also affected. The Army killed Ex-Provost and famous professor of philosophy Dr Gobindra Chandra Dev with his Muslim adopted daughter's husband. They attacked and killed Dr. A.N.M. Manirujjaman, Professor of Statistics, along with his son and two relatives. Professor Jyotirmoy Guhathakurta the provost of Jagannath Hall was severely injured by the Army attack and died in the hospital later. Dormitory electrician Chitrabali and eyewitness Rajkumari Devi state that the doctors of Dhaka Medical College Hospital recognised Dr. Guhathakurta and buried him under a tree near Dhaka Medical College morgue.
 
Assistant house tutor Anudoipayon Bhattacharja was also killed at that dorm. This information was taken from the novel "Riffel Roti Awrat" (Rifle, Bread, Women) by Professor Anwar Pasha who was later killed in December. Professor Pasha wrote this famous Bengali novel during the nine-month war period of 1971.

Killing of students
The Non-cooperation movement was organised under the banner of "Independent Bangladesh Students Movement Council" from Jahrul Hoque hall of Dhaka University. The first target of Operation Searchlight was this student hall. By 25 March all leaders of Chhatra League had left the hall. According to Professor Dr. K.M. Munim around 200 students were killed at this dorm.

After 12 o'clock the army entered Jagannath Hall and initially attacked the hall with mortars and began non-stop firing. They entered through north and south gate and indiscriminately targeted students in each room, killing around 34 students at that time. Some students of Jagannath Hall were resident of Ramna Kali Bari. So, around 5–6 were killed there. Among them only the name of Ramonimohon Bhattacharjee is known. Many guests of students who were at those dorms were also killed, including Helal of Bhairab college, Babul Paul of Bajitpur College, Baddruddojha of Jagannath Hall, Jibon Sarkar, Mostaq, Bacchu and Amar of Netrokona. Archer Blood, the then-consul general of US at Dhaka, wrote in his book The Cruel Birth of Bangladesh, "Fire was started at Rokeya Hall (girls' dormitory) and, when the students tried to escape, the military started firing. From the conversation of military control room and army unit 88, a total of 300 students death was estimated."

Killing of staff
The convoy that attacked Jahurul Huq hall initially attack staff and killed a guard guarding the British Council building. They killed hall staff: Shirajul Huq, Ali Hossain, Shohorab Ali Gaji and Abdul Majid at the University teachers lounge. At Rokeya Hall, Chottor Ahmed Ali, Abdul Khalec, Nomi, Md. Solaiman Khan, Md. Nurul Islam, Md Hafizuddin, Md. Chunnu Miya were killed with their families.

The convoy that attacked Shahid Minar and Bangla Academy also attacked Shahidullah hall, associated teachers' houses, and the home of Madhushudhan De, owner of Madhur Canteen. At building 11, Md. Sadeq, a teacher of University Laboratory School, was killed. The army left around 50 dead bodies, including some police officers (escaped from Rajarbag Police line), Bengali EPR members guarding President House and general people from Nilkhet Basti in the roof of university residential building-23.

Between 25 and 27 March the Pakistan Army destroyed three temples: the Arts building-associated Gurdwara (Sikh), Ramna Kali Temple, and Ramna Shiva Temple (Hindu) opposite Shahid Minar. At least 85 people were intentionally murdered in Ramna Kali Temple before it was demolished. That night, staff of Philosophy department Khagen De, his son Motilal De, University staff Shushil Chandra De, Bodhiram, Dakkhuram, Vimroy, Moniram, Jaharlala Rajvar, Monvaran Roy, Plumber Rajvar and Shankar Kuri were killed.

Attack at girls' dormitory
Archer Blood, the then-consul general of US at Dhaka, wrote in his book The Cruel Birth of Bangladesh, "Fire was started at Rokeya Hall (girls' dormitory) and, when the students tried to escape, the military started firing... On 10 November 1971 some armed criminals attacked Rokeya Hall and kept 30 girls confined for two hours. They also attacked Provost House". In 1971 there were two strong military establishments near Rokeya hall, it was impossible to attack university Girls' Hostel without their knowledge for two hours.

Excerpts from Genocide in Bangladesh by Kalyan Chaudhury, pp 157–158:...Some army officer raided Rokeya Hall on 7 October 1971. Accompanied by five soldiers, Major Aslam had first visited the hostel on 3 October and asked the superintendent to supply some girls who could sing and dance at a function to be held in Tejgaon Cantonment. The superintendent told him that most of the girls had left the hostel after the disturbances and only 40 students were residing but as a superintendent of a girls' hostel she should not allow them to go to the cantonment for this purpose. Dissatisfied, Major Aslam went away. Soon after the superintendent informed a higher army officer in the cantonment, over the telephone, of the Major' s mission. However, on 7 October at about 8 pm. Major Aslam and his men raided the hostel. The soldiers broke open the doors, dragged the girls out and stripped them before raping and torturing them in front of the helpless superintendent. The entire thing was done so openly without any provocation, that even the Karachi-based newspaper, Dawn, had to publish the story, violating censorship by the military authorities. In seven days after liberation about 300 girls were recovered from different places around Dacca where they had been taken away and kept confined by the Pakistani army men. On 26 December altogether 55 emaciated and half-dead girls on the verge of mental derangement were recovered by the Red Cross with the help of the Mukti Bahini and the allied forces from various hideouts of the Pakistani army in Narayanganj, Dacca Cantonment and other small towns on the periphery of Dacca city.

Academic activities at 1971
Military Governor of East Pakistan Tikka Khan ordered department heads to join work from 21 April and the other teachers on 1 June, classes to start from 2 August.  All the dormitories were cleaned to remove any signs of destruction to present a good educational environment at the university to the international community.  All exams were postponed due to the national crisis.  As the forces of war increased until September, attendance in the classes also increased.  As many students had joined the Mukti Bahini (Liberation Forces), they blasted hand grenades near the university and quickly entered classes.  As a result the Army failed to arrest anyone.

Warning, arresting and punishment of teachers
For known connections with liberation force, Tikka Khan issued arrest orders against many teachers and arrested some of them. Among them there were Dr. Abul Khayer, Dr. Rafiqul Islam, Dr. K. A. M. Salauddin, Ahsanul Hoque, Giasuddin Ahmed, Jahrul Hoque and M. Shahidullah. Military Governor of East Pakistan Tikka Khan officially warned Professor Munir Chowdhury, Professor Nilima Ibrahim, Professor Shirajul Islam Chowdhury, and Professor Enamul Hoque. Dr. Abu Muhammah Habibullah was terminated. Professor Abdur Razzak (political scientist and later National Professor of Bangladesh) was sentenced in absentia to 14 years in jail for supporting the Bengali Independence movement.

Vice-chancellor during 1971
After March 1971 Dhaka University was without any vice-chancellor. In early March the vice-chancellor Justice Abu Sayed Chowdhury was at Geneva joining "United Nations Humanitarian Conference". In the middle of March he read news about death of two students. He immediately wrote his resignation letter to State's Education Secretary and fled to London leaving the conference. There he worked for Bangladeshi liberation. After the independence of Bangladesh, he became the country's second president.

Pakistan Army fetched Dr. Syed Sajjad Hussain the then VC of Rajshahi University in their convoy. He was made VC of Dhaka University. University teachers who helped the Pakistan government included Dr. Hasan Zaman, Dr. Mohar Ali, Dr. A. K. M. Abdur Rahman, Dr. Abdul Bari, Dr. Mukbul Hossain, Dr. Saifuddin Joarder. Collaborator and VC Dr. Syed Sajjad Hussain, Dr. Hasan Zaman and Dr. Mohar Ali were arrested after the liberation of Bangladesh and exiled.

Massacre on 14 December 1971

In December, it became clear to the Pakistan government that it would lose the war. When Dhaka University reopened on 2 July 1971, teachers who collaborated with the Pakistani army gathered at Nawab Abdul Gani Road to build up a list of intellectuals who supported the Independence movement. Until then, the Pakistan Army secretly trained a group of Pakistan-supporting madrasa, college and university students. This group was named Al Badar. At the verge of the December war Al-Badar members came out and selectively killed Bengali professors, doctors, engineers and many other intellectuals. Many of those killed were teachers of Dhaka University.

On 14 December 1971, over 200 Bengali intellectuals including professors, journalists, doctors, artists, engineers, and writers were abducted from their homes in Dhaka by the Al-Badr militia and the Pakistan Army. This incident is known as the 1971 killing of Bengali intellectuals. Notable novelist Shahidullah Kaiser and playwright Munier Choudhury were among the victims. They were taken blindfolded to torture cells in Mirpur, Mohammadpur, Nakhalpara, Rajarbagh and other locations in different parts of the city. Later they were executed en masse, most notably at Rayerbazar and Mirpur. In memory of the martyred intellectuals, 14 December is mourned in Bangladesh as Shaheed Buddhijibi Dibosh, or Day of the Martyred Intellectuals.

See also
 Bangladesh Liberation War
 Mukti Bahini
 Liberation War Museum

References

Bangladesh Liberation War
School massacres in Asia
Massacres in 1971
War crimes in Bangladesh
Military history of Pakistan
Dhaka University Massacre, 1971
University of Dhaka
1971 Bangladesh genocide
Massacres committed by Pakistan in East Pakistan
March 1971 events in Bangladesh
1970s in Dhaka
School massacres in Pakistan
1971 murders in the Philippines